John Roderick Elliot "Bob" Hardisty (1 December 1921 – 31 October 1986) was an English amateur footballer who represented Great Britain at the Olympics in 1948, 1952 and 1956, making a total of six appearances.

Hardisty spent the majority of his career with Bishop Auckland, winning the Northern League seven times. Hardisty also won the FA Amateur Cup three times between 1955 and 1957.

Hardisty also made 6 appearances in the Football League for Darlington between 1946 and 1949.

Hardisty briefly came out of retirement in 1958 to play for Manchester United following the Munich air disaster, although he never made a league appearance for them.

Hardisty later became a football coach and worked with Matt Busby.
He was portrayed by the actor Liam Shannon in the 2011 BBC TV drama United.

References

1921 births
1986 deaths
English footballers
Darlington F.C. players
Bishop Auckland F.C. players
Manchester United F.C. players
English Football League players
Footballers at the 1956 Summer Olympics
Footballers at the 1952 Summer Olympics
Footballers at the 1948 Summer Olympics
Olympic footballers of Great Britain
Association football midfielders